Al-Andalus was the Muslim-ruled area of the Iberian Peninsula. The term is used by modern historians for the former Islamic states in modern Spain and Portugal. At its greatest geographical extent, it occupied most of the peninsula and a part of present-day southern France, Septimania (8th century). For nearly 100 years, from the 9th century to the 10th, al-Andalus extended its presence from Fraxinetum into the Alps with a series of organized raids.  The name describes the different Muslim states that controlled these territories at various times between 711 and 1492. These boundaries changed constantly as the Christian Reconquista progressed, eventually shrinking to the south and finally to the Emirate of Granada.

Following the Umayyad conquest of the Germanic Visigothic kingdom of Hispania, al-Andalus, then at its greatest extent, was divided into five administrative units, corresponding roughly to modern Andalusia; Castile and León; Navarre, Aragon, Catalonia; Portugal and Galicia; and the Languedoc-Roussillon area of Occitanie. As a political domain, it successively constituted a province of the Umayyad Caliphate, initiated by the Caliph al-Walid I (711–750); the Emirate of Córdoba (c. 750–929); the Caliphate of Córdoba (929–1031); the taifa kingdoms that succeeded the Caliphate of Córdoba (1009–1110); the Sanhaja Amazigh Almoravid Empire (1085–1145); the second taifa period (1140–1203); the Masmuda Amazigh Almohad Caliphate (1147–1238); the third taifa period (1232–1287); and ultimately the Nasrid Emirate of Granada (1238–1492).

Under the Caliphate of Córdoba, al-Andalus was a center of learning. The city of Córdoba, the second largest in Europe, became one of the leading cultural and economic centers throughout the Mediterranean Basin, Europe, and the Islamic world. Achievements that advanced Islamic and Western science came from al-Andalus, including major advances in trigonometry (Geber), astronomy (Arzachel), surgery (Abulcasis Al Zahrawi), pharmacology (Avenzoar), and agronomy (Ibn Bassal and Abū l-Khayr al-Ishbīlī). Al-Andalus became a major educational center for Europe and the lands around the Mediterranean Sea as well as a conduit for cultural and scientific exchange between the Islamic and Christian worlds.

Christians and Jews were subject to a special tax called jizya to the state, which in return provided internal autonomy in practicing their religion, and offered the same level of protection by the Muslim rulers. Peaceful coexistence led to their economic and social expansion. Their status was that of Dhimmis, non-Muslims living in a land governed by Muslims.

For much of its history, al-Andalus existed in conflict with Christian kingdoms to the north. After the fall of the Umayyad caliphate, al-Andalus was fragmented into minor states and principalities. Attacks from the Christians intensified, led by the Castilians under Alfonso VI. The Almoravid empire intervened and repelled the Christian attacks on the region, deposing the weak Andalusi Muslim princes including al-Andalus under direct Berber rule. In the next century and a half, al-Andalus became a province of the Berber Muslim empires of the Almoravids and Almohads, both based in Marrakesh.

Ultimately, the Christian kingdoms in the north of the Iberian Peninsula overpowered the Muslim states to the south. In 1085, Alfonso VI captured Toledo, starting a gradual decline of Muslim power. With the fall of Córdoba in 1236, most of the south quickly fell under Christian rule, and the Emirate of Granada became a tributary state of the Kingdom of Castile two years later. In 1249, the Portuguese Reconquista culminated with the conquest of the Algarve by Afonso III, leaving Granada as the last Muslim state on the Iberian Peninsula. Finally, on January 2, 1492, Emir Muhammad XII surrendered the Emirate of Granada to Queen Isabella I of Castile, completing the Christian Reconquista of the peninsula.

Name

The toponym al-Andalus is first attested by inscriptions on coins minted in 716 by the new Muslim government of Iberia. These coins, called dinars, were inscribed in both Latin and Arabic. The etymology of the name al-Andalus has traditionally been derived from the name of the Vandals (vándalos in Spanish); however, proposals since the 1980s have challenged this tradition. In 1986, Joaquín Vallvé proposed that al-Andalus was a corruption of the name Atlantis. Heinz Halm in 1989 derived the name from a Gothic term, *landahlauts, and in 2002, Georg Bossong suggested its derivation from a pre-Roman substrate.

History

Province of the Umayyad Caliphate

During the caliphate of the Umayyad Caliph Al-Walid I, the Moorish commander Tariq ibn-Ziyad led an army of 7,000 that landed at Gibraltar on April 30, 711, ostensibly to intervene in a Visigothic civil war. After a decisive victory over King Roderic at the Battle of Guadalete on July 19, 711, Tariq ibn-Ziyad, joined by Arab governor Musa ibn Nusayr of Ifriqiya, brought most of the Visigothic Kingdom under Muslim rule in a seven-year campaign. They crossed the Pyrenees and occupied Visigothic Septimania in southern France.

Most of the Iberian peninsula became part of the expanding Umayyad Empire, under the name of al-Andalus. It was organized as a province subordinate to Ifriqiya, so, for the first few decades, the governors of al-Andalus were appointed by the emir of Kairouan, rather than the Caliph in Damascus. The regional capital was set at Córdoba, and the first influx of Muslim settlers was widely distributed.

The small army Tariq led in the initial conquest consisted mostly of Berbers, while Musa's largely Arab force of over 12,000 soldiers was accompanied by a group of mawālī (Arabic, موالي), that is, non-Arab Muslims, who were clients of the Arabs. The Berber soldiers accompanying Tariq were garrisoned in the centre and the north of the peninsula, as well as in the Pyrenees, while the Berber conquerors who followed settled in many parts of the country north, east, south and west. Visigothic lords who agreed to recognize Muslim suzerainty were allowed to retain their fiefs (notably, in Murcia, Galicia, and the Ebro valley). Resistant Visigoths took refuge in the Cantabrian highlands, where they carved out a rump state, the Kingdom of Asturias.

In the 720s, the al-Andalus governors launched several sa'ifa raids into Aquitaine but were severely defeated by Duke Odo the Great of Aquitaine at the Battle of Toulouse (721). However, after crushing Odo's Berber ally Uthman ibn Naissa on the eastern Pyrenees, Abdul Rahman Al Ghafiqi led an expedition north across the western Pyrenees and defeated the Aquitanian duke, who in turn appealed to the Frankish leader Charles Martel for assistance, offering to place himself under Carolingian sovereignty. At the Battle of Poitiers in 732, the al-Andalus raiding army was defeated by Charles Martel. In 734, the Andalusi launched raids to the east, capturing Avignon and Arles and overran much of Provence. In 737, they traveled up the Rhône valley, reaching as far north as Burgundy. Charles Martel of the Franks, with the assistance of Liutprand of the Lombards, invaded Burgundy and Provence and expelled the raiders by 739.

In 740, a Berber Revolt erupted in the Maghreb (North Africa). To put down the rebellion, the Umayyad Caliph Hisham dispatched a large Arab army, composed of regiments (Junds) of Bilad Ash-Sham, to North Africa. But the great Umayyad army was crushed by the Berber rebels at the Battle of Bagdoura (in Morocco). Heartened by the victories of their North African brethren, the Berbers of al-Andalus quickly raised their own revolt. Berber garrisons in the north of the Iberian Peninsula mutinied, deposed their Arab commanders, and organized a large rebel army to march against the strongholds of Toledo, Cordoba, and Algeciras.

In 741, Balj b. Bishr led a detachment of some 10,000 Arab troops across the straits. The Arab governor of al-Andalus, joined by this force, crushed the Berber rebels in a series of ferocious battles in 742. However, a quarrel immediately erupted between the Syrian commanders and the Andalusi, the so-called "original Arabs" of the earlier contingents. The Syrians defeated them at the hard-fought Battle of Aqua Portora in August 742 but were too few to impose themselves on the province.

The quarrel was settled in 743 when Abū l-Khaṭṭār al-Ḥusām, the new governor of al-Andalus, assigned the Syrians to regimental fiefs across al-Andalus the Damascus jund was established in Elvira (Granada), the Jordan jund in Rayyu (Málaga and Archidona), the Jund Filastin in Medina-Sidonia and Jerez, the Emesa (Hims) jund in Seville and Niebla, and the Qinnasrin jund in Jaén. The Egypt jund was divided between Beja (Alentejo) in the west and Tudmir (Murcia) in the east. The arrival of the Syrians substantially increased the Arab element in the Iberian peninsula and helped strengthen the Muslim hold on the south. However, at the same time, unwilling to be governed, the Syrian junds carried on an existence of autonomous feudal anarchy, severely destabilizing the authority of the governor of al-Andalus.

A second significant consequence of the revolt was the expansion of the Kingdom of the Asturias, hitherto confined to enclaves in the Cantabrian highlands. After the rebellious Berber garrisons evacuated the northern frontier fortresses, the Christian king Alfonso I of Asturias set about immediately seizing the empty forts for himself, quickly adding the northwestern provinces of Galicia and León to his fledgling kingdom. The Asturians evacuated the Christian populations from the towns and villages of the Galician-Leonese lowlands, creating an empty buffer zone in the Douro River valley (the "Desert of the Duero"). This newly emptied frontier remained roughly in place for the next few centuries as the boundary between the Christian north and the Islamic south. Between this frontier and its heartland in the south, the al-Andalus state had three large march territories (thughur): the Lower March (capital initially at Mérida, later Badajoz), the Middle March (centered at Toledo), and the Upper March (centered at Zaragoza).

These disturbances and disorders also allowed the Franks, now under the leadership of Pepin the Short, to invade the strategic strip of Septimania in 752, hoping to deprive al-Andalus of an easy launching pad for raids into Francia. After a lengthy siege, the last Arab stronghold, the citadel of Narbonne, finally fell to the Franks in 759. Al-Andalus was sealed off at the Pyrenees.

The third consequence of the Berber revolt was the collapse of the authority of the Damascus Caliphate over the western provinces. With the Umayyad Caliphs distracted by the challenge of the Abbasids in the east, the western provinces of the Maghreb and al-Andalus spun out of their control. From around 745, the Fihrids, an illustrious local Arab clan descended from Oqba ibn Nafi al-Fihri, seized power in the western provinces and ruled them almost as a private family empire of their own Abd al-Rahman ibn Habib al-Fihri in Ifriqiya and Yūsuf al-Fihri in al-Andalus. The Fihrids welcomed the fall of the Umayyads in the east, in 750, and sought to reach an understanding with the Abbasids, hoping they might be allowed to continue their autonomous existence.  But when the Abbasids rejected the offer and demanded submission, the Fihrids declared independence and, probably out of spite, invited the deposed remnants of the Umayyad clan to take refuge in their dominions. It was a fateful decision that they soon regretted, for the Umayyads, the sons and grandsons of caliphs, had a more legitimate claim to rule than the Fihrids themselves. Rebellious-minded local lords, disenchanted with the autocratic rule of the Fihrids, conspired with the arriving Umayyad exiles.

Umayyad Emirate of Córdoba

Establishment 

In 755, the exiled Umayyad prince Abd al-Rahman I (also called al-Dākhil, the 'Immigrant') arrived on the coast of Spain. He had fled the Abbasids, who had overthrown the Umayyads in Syria and were slaughtering members of that family, and then he spent four years in exile in North Africa, assessing the political situation in al-Andalus across the Straits of Gibraltar, before he landed at Almuñécar.

News of his arrival spread across al-Andalus, and when word reached its governor, Yūsuf al-Fihri, he was not pleased. During this time, Abd al-Rahman and his supporters quickly conquered Málaga and then Seville, finally besieging the capital of al-Andalus, Córdoba. Abd al-Rahman's army was exhausted after their conquest, meanwhile Governor Yūsuf al-Fihri had returned from quashing another rebellion with his army. The siege of Córdoba began, and noticing the starving state of Abd al-Rahman's army, al-Fihri began throwing lavish feasts every day as the siege went on, to tempt Abd al Rahman's supporters to defect to his side. However, Abd al-Rahman persisted, even rejecting a truce that would have allowed Abd al-Rahman to marry al-Fihri's daughter. After decisively defeating Yūsuf al-Fihri's army, Abd al-Rahman was able to conquer Córdoba, where he proclaimed himself emir in 756. The rest of Iberia was easily conquered, and Abd al-Rahman soon had control of all of Iberia.

Rule 
Abd al Rahman's rule was stable in the years after his conquest – he built major public works, most famously the Mosque of Córdoba, and helped urbanize the emirate while defending it from invaders, including the quashing of numerous rebellions, and decisively repelling the invasion by Charlemagne (which would later inspire the epic, Chanson de Roland). By far the most important of these invasions was the attempted reconquest by the Abbasid Caliphate. In 763 Caliph Al-Mansur of the Abbasids installed al-Ala ibn-Mugith as governor of Africa (whose title gave him dominion over the province of al-Andalus). He planned to invade and destroy the Emirate of Córdoba, so in response Abd al Rahman fortified himself within the fortress of Carmona with a tenth as many soldiers as al-Ala ibn-Mugith. After a long  siege, it appeared that Abd al Rahman would be defeated, but in a last stand Abd al Rahman with his outnumbered forces opened the gates of the fortress and charged at the resting Abbasid army, and decisively defeated them. After being sent the embalmed head of al-Ala ibn-Mugith, it is said Al Mansur exclaimed "Praise be to God who has put the sea between me and this devil!".

Abd al Rahman I died in 788 after a lengthy and prosperous reign. He was succeeded by his son, Hisham I, who secured power by exiling his brother who had tried to rebel against him. Hisham enjoyed a stable reign of eight years and was succeeded by his son Al-Hakam I. The next few decades were relatively uneventful, with only occasional minor rebellions, and saw the rise of the emirate. In 822 Al Hakam died and was succeeded by Abd al-Rahman II, the first great emir of Córdoba. He rose to power with no opposition and sought to reform the emirate. He quickly reorganized the bureaucracy to be more efficient and built many mosques across the emirate. During his reign science and art flourished, as many scholars fled the Abbasid caliphate due to the disastrous Fourth Fitna. The scholar Abbas ibn Firnas made an attempt to flee, though accounts vary on his success. In 852 Abd al Rahman II died, leaving behind him a powerful and well-established state that had become one of the most powerful in the Mediterranean.

Abd al Rahman was succeeded by Muhammad I of Córdoba, who according to legend had to wear women's clothing to sneak into the imperial palace and be crowned, since he was not the heir apparent. His reign marked a decline in the emirate, which was ended by Abd al-Rahman III. His reign was marked by multiple rebellions, which were dealt with poorly and weakened the emirate, most disastrously following the rebellion of Umar ibn Hafsun. When Muhammad died, he was succeeded by emir Abdullah ibn Muhammad al-Umawi whose power barely reached outside of the city of Córdoba. As Ibn Hafsun ravaged the south, Abdullah did almost nothing, and slowly became more and more isolated, barely speaking to anyone. Abdullah purged his administration of his brothers, which lessened the bureaucracy's loyalty towards him. Around this time several local Arab lords began to revolt, including one Kurayb ibn Khaldun, who was able to conquer Seville. Some loyalists tried to quell the rebellion, but without proper material support, their efforts were in vain.

He declared that the next emir would be his grandson Abd al-Rahman III, ignoring the claims of his four living children. Abdullah died in 912, and the throne passed to Abd al Rahman III. Through force of arms and diplomacy, he put down the rebellions that had disrupted his grandfather's reign, obliterating Ibn Hafsun and hunting down his sons. After this he led several sieges against the Christians, sacking the city of Pamplona, and restoring some prestige to the emirate. Meanwhile, across the sea the Fatimids had risen up in force, ousted the Abbasid government in North Africa, and declared themselves a caliphate. Inspired by this action, Abd al Rahman joined the rebellion and declared himself caliph in 929.

Umayyad Caliphate of Córdoba 

 The period of the Caliphate is seen as the golden age of al-Andalus. Crops produced using irrigation, along with food imported from the Middle East, provided the area around Córdoba and some other Andalusī cities with an agricultural economic sector that was the most advanced in Europe by far, sparking the Arab Agricultural Revolution. Among European cities, Córdoba under the Caliphate, with a population of perhaps 500,000, eventually overtook Constantinople as the largest and most prosperous city in Europe. Within the Islamic world, Córdoba was one of the leading cultural centres. The work of its most important philosophers and scientists (notably Abulcasis and Averroes) had a major influence on the intellectual life of medieval Europe.

Muslims and non-Muslims often came from abroad to study at the famous libraries and universities of al-Andalus, mainly after the reconquest of Toledo in 1085 and the establishment of translation institutions such as the Toledo School of Translators. The most noted of those was Michael Scot (c. 1175 to c. 1235), who took the works of Ibn Rushd ("Averroes") and Ibn Sina ("Avicenna") to Italy. This transmission of ideas significantly affected the formation of the European Renaissance.

The Caliphate of Cordoba also had extensive trade with other parts of the Mediterranean, including Christian parts. Trade goods included luxury items (silk, ceramics, gold), essential foodstuffs (grain, olive oil, wine), and containers (such as ceramics for storing perishables). In the tenth century, Amalfitans were already trading Ifriqiyan and Byzantine silks in Umayyad Cordoba. Later references to Amalfitan merchants were sometimes used to emphasize the previous golden age of Cordoba. Fatimid Egypt was also a supplier of luxury goods, including elephant tusks, and raw or carved crystals. The Fatimids were traditionally thought to be the only supplier of such goods but were also valuable connections to Ghana. Control over these trade routes was a cause of conflict between Umayyads and Fatimids.

Taifas period

The Caliphate of Córdoba effectively collapsed during a ruinous civil war between 1009 and 1013, although it was not finally abolished until 1031 when al-Andalus broke up into a number of mostly independent mini-states and principalities called taifas. In 1013, invading Berbers sacked Córdoba, massacring its inhabitants, pillaging the city, and burning the palace complex to the ground. The largest of the taifas to emerge were Badajoz (Batalyaws), Toledo (Ṭulayṭulah), Zaragoza (Saraqusta), and Granada (Ġarnāṭah). After 1031, the taifas were generally too weak to defend themselves against repeated raids and demands for tribute from the Christian states to the north and west, which were known to the Muslims as "the Galician nations", and which had spread from their initial strongholds in Galicia, Asturias, Cantabria, the Basque country, and the Carolingian Marca Hispanica to become the Kingdoms of Navarre, León, Portugal, Castile and Aragon, and the County of Barcelona. Eventually raids turned into conquests, and in response the Taifa kings were forced to request help from the Almoravids, Muslim Berber rulers of the Maghreb. Their desperate maneuver would eventually fall to their disadvantage, however, as the Almoravids they had summoned from the south went on to conquer and annex all the Taifa kingdoms. During the eleventh century several centers of power existed among the taifas, and the political situation shifted rapidly. Before the rise of the Almoravids from the south or the Christians from the north, the Abbadid-ruled Taifa of Seville succeeded in conquering a dozen lesser kingdoms, becoming the most powerful and renowned of the taifas, such that it could have laid claim to be the true heir to the Caliphate of Cordoba. The taifas were vulnerable and divided but had immense wealth. During its prominence the Taifa of Seville produced technically complex lusterware and exerted significant influence on ceramic production across al-Andalus.

Almoravids, Almohads, and Marinids

In 1086 the Almoravid ruler of Morocco, Yusuf ibn Tashfin, was invited by the Muslim princes in Iberia to defend them against Alfonso VI, King of Castile and León. In that year, Tashfin crossed the straits to Algeciras and inflicted a severe defeat on the Christians at the Battle of Sagrajas. By 1094, ibn Tashfin had removed all Muslim princes in Iberia and had annexed their states, except for the one at Zaragoza. He also regained Valencia from the Christians. The city-kingdom had been conquered and ruled by El Cid at the end of its second taifa period. The Almoravid dynasty made its capital in Marrakesh, from which it ruled its domains in al-Andalus. Modern scholarship has sometimes admitted originality in North African architecture, but according to Yasser Tabbaa, historian of Islamic art and architecture, the Iberocentric viewpoint is anachronistic when considering the political and cultural environment during the rule of the Almoravid dynasty. The rise and fall of the Almoravids is sometimes seen as an expression of Ibn Khaldun's asabiyyah paradigm.

The Almoravids were succeeded by the Almohads, another Berber dynasty, after the victory of Abu Yusuf Ya'qub al-Mansur over the Castilian Alfonso VIII at the Battle of Alarcos in 1195. In 1212, a coalition of Christian kings under the leadership of the Castilian Alfonso VIII defeated the Almohads at the Battle of Las Navas de Tolosa. The Almohads continued to rule Al-Andalus for another decade, though with much reduced power and prestige. The civil wars following the death of Abu Ya'qub Yusuf II rapidly led to the re-establishment of taifas. The taifas, newly independent but now weakened, were quickly conquered by Portugal, Castile, and Aragon. After the fall of Murcia (1243) and the Algarve (1249), only the Emirate of Granada remained as a Muslim state in Iberia, tributary of Castile until 1492. Most of its tribute was paid in gold that was carried to Iberia from present-day Mali and Burkina Faso through the merchant routes of the Sahara.

The last Muslim threat to the Christian kingdoms was the rise of the Marinids in Morocco during the 14th century. They took Granada into their sphere of influence and occupied some of its cities, like Algeciras. However, they were unable to take Tarifa, which held out until the arrival of the Castilian Army led by Alfonso XI. The Castilian king, with the help of Afonso IV of Portugal and Peter IV of Aragon, decisively defeated the Marinids at the Battle of Río Salado in 1340 and took Algeciras in 1344. Gibraltar, then under Granadian rule, was besieged in 1349–50. Alfonso XI and most of his army perished by the Black Death. His successor, Peter of Castile, made peace with the Muslims and turned his attention to Christian lands, starting a period of almost 150 years of rebellions and wars between the Christian states that secured the survival of Granada.

Emirate of Granada, its fall, and aftermath

From the mid 13th to the late 15th century, the only remaining domain of al-Andalus was the Emirate of Granada, the last Muslim stronghold in the Iberian Peninsula. The emirate was established by Muhammad ibn al-Ahmar in 1230 and was ruled by the Nasrid dynasty, the longest reigning dynasty in the history of al-Andalus. Although surrounded by Castilian lands, the emirate was wealthy through being tightly integrated in Mediterranean trade networks and enjoyed a period of considerable cultural and economic prosperity.

However, for most of its existence Granada was a tributary state, with Nasrid emirs paying tribute to Castilian kings. Granada's status as a tributary state and its favorable geographic location, with the Sierra Nevada as a natural barrier, helped to prolong Nasrid rule and allowed the emirate to prosper as a regional entrepôt with the Maghreb and the rest of Africa. The city of Granada also served as a refuge for Muslims fleeing during the Reconquista, accepting numerous Muslims expelled from Christian controlled areas, doubling the size of the city and even becoming one of the largest in Europe throughout the 15th century in terms of population. The independent Nasrid kingdom was also a trade hub between the Atlantic and Mediterranean, and was frequented especially by Genoese merchants.

In 1469, the marriage of Ferdinand of Aragon and Isabella of Castile signaled the launch of the final assault on the emirate. The King and Queen convinced Pope Sixtus IV to declare their war a crusade. The Catholic Monarchs crushed one center of resistance after another until finally on January 2, 1492, after a long siege, the emirate's last sultan Muhammad XII surrendered the city and the fortress palace, the renowned Alhambra (see Fall of Granada).

By this time Muslims in Castile numbered half a million. After the fall, "100,000 had died or been enslaved, 200,000 emigrated, and 200,000 remained as the residual population. Many of the Muslim elite, including Muhammad XII, who had been given the area of the Alpujarras mountains as a principality, found life under Christian rule intolerable and passed over into North Africa." Under the conditions of the Capitulations of 1492, the Muslims in Granada were to be allowed to continue to practice their religion.

Mass forced conversions of Muslims in 1499 led to a revolt that spread to Alpujarras and the mountains of Ronda; after this uprising the capitulations were revoked. In 1502 the Catholic Monarchs decreed the forced conversion of all Muslims living under the rule of the Crown of Castile, although in the kingdoms of Aragon and Valencia (both now part of Spain) the open practice of Islam was allowed until 1526. Descendants of the Muslims were subject to expulsions from Spain between 1609 and 1614 (see Expulsion of the Moriscos). The last mass prosecution against Moriscos for crypto-Islamic practices occurred in Granada in 1727, with most of those convicted receiving relatively light sentences. From then on, indigenous Islam is considered to have been extinguished in Spain.

Science 
There were many scientific advances, especially in the fields of medicine, astronomy, and agronomy in Al-Andalus. Córdoba served as a major center for this scientific growth, with a vast amount of these advancements occurring during the rule of ‘Abd al-Rahman III from 929 to 961, in part due to the exposure of scientists to translations of older Greek and Persian works during that time. Scholars often worked in many different and overlapping subjects, so it is difficult to place those discussed here into a single scientific field each.

Medicine 

Notable surgeons, physicians, and medical scholars from al-Andalus include Ibn al-Baytar (d. 1248), Abu al-Qasim al-Zahrawi (Albucasis; d. 1013), Muhammad al-Shafrah (d. 1360), Abu Marwan 'Abd al-Malik ibn Habib (d. 853), and Abu Marwan ibn Zuhr (Avenzoar; d. 1162). Of particular note is al-Zahrawi, who is considered by many to be "probably the greatest physician in the entire history of Western Islam." Around the year 1000 C.E, he wrote a book with a title that roughly translates to The Arrangement of Medical Knowledge for One Who is Not Able to Compile a Book for Himself (Kitab al-tasrif li-man 'ajiza 'an al-ta'alif)—a comprehensive medical encyclopedia with the goal of summarizing all existing medical knowledge and eliminating the need for students and practitioners to rely on multiple medical texts. The book is renowned for its chapter on surgery which included important illustrations of surgical instruments, as well as sections "on cauterization, on incisions, venesection and wounds, and on bone-setting." For hundreds of years after its publication it was one of the most widely used medical texts for students and medical practitioners and was translated into Hebrew, Latin, and Castilian. This encyclopedia is also significant for its inclusion of al-Zahrawi's personal experiences as a surgeon, which provided important case studies for aspiring surgeons. This distinguishes it from other strictly factual medical works of the time, most notably Ibn Sina's Canon of Medicine.

Other important medical texts include al-Baytar's Comprehensive Book on Simple Drugs and Foodstuffs—an encyclopedia with descriptions of the medical uses of over 1400 plants and other types of medicine—and ibn Habib's Book of the Medicine of the Arabs (Kitab tibb al-'arab)—a historical summary of Arabic medicine until the 9th century. Ibn Habib's work is significant because it is one of the oldest known writings in the field of prophetic medicine, which uses hadiths to create Islamic-based medicinal guidelines. His book is also significant because it uses principles of Galenic medicine, such as humorism and the theory of four temperaments, as the basis of its medical recommendations.

The ibn Zuhr family played a very important role in the production of Andalusi medical knowledge, as they produced five generations of medical experts, particularly in the fields of dietary sciences and medicaments. Abu Marwan ibn Zuhr (d. 1162) is particularly notable, as he wrote the Book of Moderation (Kitab al-Iqtisad)—a treatise on general therapy; the Book of Foods (Kitab al-Aghdhiya)—a manual on foods and regimen which contains guidelines for a healthy life; and the Kitab al-Taysir—a book written to act as a compendium to Ibn Rushd's Colliget. In Kitab al-Taysir he provides one of the earliest clinical descriptions of the scabies mite.

Astronomy 
Three of the most notable Andalusi astronomers were Ibn Tufail (d. 1185), Ibn Rushd (Averroes; d. 1198), and Nur ad-Din al-Bitruji (Alpetragius; d. 1204). All lived around the same time and focused their astronomical works on critiquing and revising Ptolemaic astronomy and the problem of the equant in his astronomical model. Instead, they accepted Aristotle's model and promoted the theory of homocentric spheres.

Al-Bitruji is believed to have studied under Ibn Tufail and Bitruji's Book on Cosmology (Kitab fi al-hay'a) built on Ibn Tufail's work, as well as that of Ibn Rushd, Ibn Bajja, and Maimonides. The book's goal was "to overcome the physical difficulties inherent in the geometrical models of Ptolemy's Almagest and to describe the cosmos in agreement with Aristotelian or Neoplatonic physics," which it succeeded in doing to an extent. Bitruji's book set a precedent of criticizing the Almagest in future works in the field of astronomy.

Although Ibn Rushd originally trained and practiced as a jurist, he was exposed to astronomy—possibly through Ibn Tufail—and became a renowned scientist in the field. His most popular work was his Summary of the Almagest, but he also published shorter works discussing Aristotle's planetary theories. Ibn Rushd published writings on philosophy, theology, and medicine throughout his life too, including commentaries on the works of Ibn Sina.

In addition to writing the important Book of the Medicine of the Arabs, Ibn Habib also wrote the Book on Stars (Kirab fi l-nujim). This book included important "teachings on the lunar mansions, the signs of the zodiac, [and] the division of the seasons." In these teachings, Ibn-Habib calculated the phases of the moon and dates of the annual solstices and equinoxes with relative accuracy.

Another important astronomer from al-Andalus was Maslama al-Majriti (d. 1007), who played a role in translating and writing about Ptolemy's Planisphaerium and Almagest. He built on the work of older astronomers, like Muhammad ibn Musa al-Khwarizmi, whose astronomical tables he wrote a discussion on and subsequently improved.

Abu Ishaq Ibrahim al-Zarqali (d. 1087) had many influential astronomical successes, as shown by Copernicus's recognition of him in his On the Revolutions of the Heavenly Spheres five centuries later. Along with other astronomers, he undertook extensive work to edit the Toledan Zij astronomical tables. He also accurately calculated the motion of the solar apogee to be 12.04 seconds per year, which is relatively close to today's calculation of 11.8 seconds per year.

 Agronomy 
Other important scientific advances in al-Andalus occurred in the field of agronomy. These advances were in part facilitated by technological innovations in irrigation systems. State organized, large-scale irrigation projects provided water to city baths, mosques, gardens, residential homes, and governing palaces, such as the al-Hambra and its gardens in Granada. Collective, peasant-built irrigation infrastructure also played an important role, especially in agriculture. Many of these irrigation techniques, especially those utilized by peasants, were brought to al-Andalus by migrating Berber and Arab tribes. Although some irrigation projects built on existing Roman infrastructure, most of al-Andalus's irrigation systems were new projects built separate from old Roman aqueducts. However, there is some debate about this among scholars.

One notable agriculturalist was Ibn al-'Awwam, who wrote the Book of Agriculture. This book contains 34 chapters about various aspects of agriculture and animal husbandry, including discussions of over 580 different types of plants and how to treat plant diseases.

Other agronomic innovations in al-Andalus include the cultivation of the pomegranate from Syria, which has since become the namesake and ubiquitous symbol of the city of Granada, as well as the first attempt to create a botanical garden near Córdoba by ‘Abd al-Rahman I.

Culture

 Society 

The society of al-Andalus was made up of three main religious groups: Muslims, Christians, and Jews. The Muslims, although united on the religious level, had several ethnic divisions, the main being the distinction between the Arabs and the Berbers. The Arab elite regarded non-Arab Muslims as second-class citizens; and they were particularly scornful of the Berbers.

The ethnic structure of al-Andalus consisted of Arabs at the top of the social scale followed by, in descending order, Berbers, Muladies, Mozarabes, and Jews. Each of these communities inhabited distinct neighborhoods in the cities. In the 10th century a massive conversion of Christians took place, and muladies (Muslims of native Iberian origin), formed the majority of Muslims. The Muwalladun had spoken in the local Romance dialects of Latin collectively called Mozarabic while increasingly adopting the Arabic language, which eventually evolved into the Andalusi Arabic in which Muslims, Jews, and Christians became monolingual in the last surviving Muslim state in the Iberian Peninsula, the Emirate of Granada (1230–1492). Eventually, the Muladies, and later the Berber tribes, adopted an Arabic identity like the majority of subject people in Egypt, the Levant, Mesopotamia, and North Africa. Muladies, together with other Muslims, comprised eighty percent of the population of al-Andalus by 1100. Mozarabs were Christians who had long lived under Muslim and Arab rule, adopting many Arab customs, art, and words, while still maintaining their Christian and Latin rituals and their own Romance languages.

The Jewish population worked mainly as tax collectors, in trade, or as doctors or ambassadors. At the end of the 15th century there were about 50,000 Jews in Granada and roughly 100,000 in the whole of Islamic Iberia.

Non-Muslims were given the status of ahl al-dhimma (people under protection), with adult men paying a "Jizya" tax equal to one dinar per year with exemptions for the elderly and the disabled. Those who were neither Christians nor Jews, such as pagans, were given the status of Majus. The treatment of non-Muslims in the Caliphate has been a subject of considerable debate among scholars and commentators, especially those interested in drawing parallels to the co-existence of Muslims and non-Muslims in the modern world.

Jews constituted more than five percent of the population. Al-Andalus was a key centre of Jewish life during the early Middle Ages, produced important scholars and was one of the most stable and wealthy Jewish communities.

The longest period of relative tolerance began after 912, with the reign of Abd-ar-Rahman III and his son, Al-Hakam II, and the Jews of al-Andalus prospered by devoting themselves to the service of the Caliphate of Córdoba the study of the sciences; and to commerce and industry, especially by trading in silk and slaves, which thus promoted the prosperity of the country. Southern Iberia became an asylum for the oppressed Jews of other countries.Kraemer, 2005, pp. 10–13.

Under the Almoravids and the Almohads, there may have been intermittent persecution of Jews, but sources are extremely scarce and do not give a clear picture though the situation appears to have deteriorated after 1160. Muslim pogroms against Jews in al-Andalus occurred in Córdoba (1011) and in Granada (1066).Granada by Richard Gottheil, Meyer Kayserling, Jewish Encyclopedia. 1906 ed. However, massacres of dhimmis are believed to be rare in Islamic history.

The Almohads, who had taken control of the Almoravids' Maghribi and Andalusi territories by 1147, far surpassed the Almoravides in fundamentalist outlook, and treated the non-Muslims harshly. Faced with the choice of either death or conversion, many Jews and Christians emigrated. Some, such as the family of Maimonides, fled east to more tolerant Muslim lands.

Many ethnicities and religions co-existed in al-Andalus, each of which contributed to its intellectual prosperity. Literacy in Islamic Iberia was far more widespread than in many other nations in the West of the time.

In the 11th century, the Hindu-Arabic numeral system (base 10) had reached Europe via Al-Andalus through Spanish Muslims, together with knowledge of astronomy and instruments like the astrolabe, which was first imported by Gerbert of Aurillac. For that reason, the numerals came to be known in Europe as Arabic numerals despite their origins in India.

From the earliest days, the Umayyads wanted to be seen as intellectual rivals to the Abbasids and for Córdoba to have libraries and educational institutions to that of their rival, Baghdad. Although there was a clear rivalry between the two powers, there was freedom to travel between the two caliphates, which helped spread new ideas and innovations over time.

Language

Initially, most of the population spoke Romance dialects. That led to the formation of Iberian Romance dialects that were collectively known as Mozarabic or Andalusi Romance. The few writings in those dialects that have been found use an Arabic script and seem to retain many archaic features of Vulgar Latin. They are usually assumed to have been increasingly subject to Arabic influence. However, as the use of Arabic by Muwalladûn, urban Christians and Sephardi Jews spread in the south, and Mozarab Christians were linguistically assimilated by the Christian Kingdoms in the north, the Mozarabic dialects eventually disappeared. Because of that assimilation, however, Mozarabic became the main source and vehicle of transmission of Arabic loanwords to Spanish and Portuguese.

During the latter half of Islamic rule, the bulk of the population spoke only Andalusi Arabic.  Romance vernaculars (Mozarabic) ceased to be spoken in the 13th century, on the one hand following a gradual decline initiated in the 10th century in Al-Andalus, and on the other hand because of the shrinking of the Muslim-ruled lands and the expansion of Romance varieties from further north.

 Art and architecture 

In Cordoba, Abd ar-Rahman I built the Great Mosque of Cordoba in 785. It was expanded multiple times up until the 10th century, and after the Reconquista it was converted into a Catholic cathedral. Its key features include a hypostyle hall with marble columns supporting two-tiered arches, a horseshoe-arch mihrab, ribbed domes, a courtyard (sahn) with gardens, and a minaret (later converted into a bell tower). Abd ar-Rahman III, at the height of his power, began construction of Madinat al-Zahra, a luxurious palace-city to serve as a new capital. The Umayyads also reconstructed the Roman-era bridge over the Guadalquivir River in Cordoba, while the Almohads later added the Calahorra Tower to the bridge. The Bab al-Mardum Mosque (later converted to a church) in Toledo is a well-preserved example of a small neighbourhood mosque built at the end of the Caliphate period.

The official workshops of the Caliphate, such as those at Madinat al-Zahra, fabricated luxury products for use at court or as gifts for guests, allies, and diplomats, which stimulated artistic production. Many objects produced in the caliph's workshops later made their way into the collections of museums and Christian cathedrals in Europe. Among the most famous objects of this period are ivory boxes which are carved with vegetal, figurative, and epigraphic motifs. Notable surviving examples include the Pyxis of al-Mughira, the Pyxis of Zamora, and the Leyre Casket.

During the Taifas period, art and culture continued to flourish despite the political fragmentation of Al-Andalus. The Aljaferia Palace of Zaragoza is the most significant palace preserved from this period, featuring complex ornamental arcades and stucco decoration. In other cities, a number of important palaces or fortresses were begun or expanded by local dynasties such as the Alcazaba of Málaga and the Alcazaba of Almería. Other examples of architecture from around this period include the Bañuelo of Granada, an Islamic bathhouse.

In Seville, Almohad rulers built the Great Mosque of Seville (later transformed into the Cathedral of Seville), which consisted of a hypostyle prayer hall, a courtyard (now known as the Patio de los Naranjos or Court of Oranges), and a massive minaret tower now known as the Giralda. The minaret was later expanded after being converted into a bell tower for the current cathedral. Almohad architecture promoted new forms and decorative designs such as the multifoil arch and the sebka motif, probably influenced by the Caliphate-period architecture of Cordoba.Artists and intellectuals took refuge at Granada after the Christian kingdoms expanded significantly in the 13th century. The palaces of the Alhambra and the Generalife in Granada reflect the culture and art of the last centuries of Muslim rule of Al-Andalus. The complex was begun by Ibn al-Ahmar, the first Nasrid emir, and the last major additions were made during the reigns of Yusuf I (1333–1353) and Muhammad V (1353–1391). It integrates buildings and gardens with the natural qualities of the site and is a testament to Andalusi culture and to the skills of the Muslim artisans, craftsmen, and builders of their era. Nasrid architecture continued the earlier traditions of Andalusi architecture while also synthesizing them into its own distinctive style, which had many similarities with contemporary Marinid architecture in North Africa. It is characterized by the use of the courtyard as a central space and basic unit around which other halls and rooms were organized. Courtyards typically had water features at their center, such as a reflective pool or a fountain. Decoration was focused on the inside of buildings and was executed primarily with tile mosaics on lower walls and carved stucco on the upper walls. Geometric patterns, vegetal motifs, and calligraphy were the main types of decorative motifs. Additionally, "stalactite"-like sculpting, known as muqarnas, was used for three-dimensional features like vaulted ceilings, particularly during the reign of Muhammad V and after.

Even after Muslim territories were conquered by the Christian kingdoms, Andalusi art and architecture continued to appear for many years as a prestigious style under new Christian patrons employing Muslim craftsmen, becoming what is known as the Mudéjar style (named after the Mudéjars or Muslims under Christian rule). Numerous examples are found in the early churches of Toledo (e.g. the Church of San Román, 13th century) and in the cities of Aragon such as Zaragoza and Teruel. Among the most famous examples is the Alcázar of Seville, the former Abbadid and Almohad palace redeveloped by Christian rulers such as Peter of Castile, who in 1364 started adding new Moorish-style sections with the help of Muslim craftsmen from Granada and Toledo. Some surviving 13th and 14th-century Jewish synagogues were also built (or rebuilt) in Mudéjar style under Christian rule, such as the Synagogue of Santa Maria la Blanca in Toledo (rebuilt in its current form circa 1250), the Synagogue of Cordoba (1315), and the Synagogue of El Tránsito (1355–1357).

 Food and agriculture 

A variety of foodstuffs, spices and crops were introduced to Spain and Sicily during Arab rule, via the commercial networks of the Islamic world. These include sugarcane, rice, cotton, alfalfa, oranges, lemons, apricots, spinach, eggplants, carrots, saffron and bananas. The Arabs also continued extensive cultivation and production of olive oil (the Spanish words for 'oil' and 'olive'—aceite and aceituna, respectively—are derived from the Arabic al-zait, meaning 'olive juice'), and pomegranates (the heraldic symbol of Granada) from classical Greco-Roman times.

Arabic influence still lingers on in Spanish cuisine through these fruits, vegetables, spices and cooking and agricultural techniques. One of the largest palm groves in the world, called the Palmeral of Elche, was established by the Arabs between the 7th-10th centuries to facilitate fruit (including pomegranate and date crops) and vegetable growth underneath the cool shade of palm trees and irrigation channels, and is cited by UNESCO as an example of the transfer of agricultural practices from one continent (North Africa) to another (Iberian Peninsula of Europe).

The period of Arab rule also involved the extension of Roman irrigation channels as well as the introduction of novel irrigation techniques from the Persianate world, such as the acequia (deriving from the classical Arabic as-sāqiya) – subterranean channels used to transport water from highland aquifers to lowland fields in arid environments –first originating in either the Arabian Peninsula or the Persian Empire (referred to as qanat or karez in the Middle East). These structures are still found in Andalusia province, particularly in Granada.

The confection alfajor (supposedly from ) has its origins in al-Andalus.

Literature and poetry

According to Isaak Moiseevich Filʹshtinskiĭ, "in the 10th century, a favourable influence on the development of Andalusi literature was exerted by the literary circles organised by rich and noble Cordovan patrons." According to Jaakko Hämeen-Anttila: "Andalusian literature was still very much dominated by the Eastern tradition around the year 1000, and the Arabs of Spain probably felt somewhat isolated."

Arabic-Andalusi poetry was marked by the rise of muwashshah. As worded by James T. Monroe, Ibn Quzman also "raised the native, popular, and colloquial zajal form to a higher literary level than it had previously enjoyed in his homeland," although "his work found greater acceptance in Baghdad than it did in the far West of the Islamic world." Rithā’ al-Andalus is considered the most significant of a series of poems that were written in the classical tradition of rithā’ (which denotes both lamentation and a literary genre in itself) by Andalusi poets who had taken inspiration from the fall of Andalusi cities and territories. Jewish poetry from Al-Andalus also developed, mostly but not exclusively in Hebrew, with significant consonance with Arabic poetry in both theme and form.Sarah Stroumsa, Andalus and Sefarad, 2019, page 86.

One specialist of Al-Andalus' intellectual history, Maria Luisa Avila, says that "biographical dictionaries have recorded information about thousands of distinguished people in every period from al-Andalus, who were cultivators of knowledge, particularly in the legal-religious sciences as well as authors", and that "the exact number of scholars which appears in the biographical sources has not been established yet, but it surely exceeds six thousand." It has been estimated that in the 10th century between 70,000 and 80,000 manuscripts were copied on a yearly basis in Cordoba alone.

 Music 

The music of al-Andalus represents an influential and highly regarded musical tradition. The legendary figure Ziryab came from the Abbasid  East and arrived in Cordoba in 822, revolutionizing Andalusi music as well as other aspects of Andalusi culture. Poetic forms such as the muwashshah, the kharja, the nawba, and the zajal are prominent in Andalusi music.

Philosophy

Al-Andalus philosophy

The historian Said al-Andalus wrote that Caliph Abd-ar-Rahman III had collected libraries of books and granted patronage to scholars of medicine and "ancient sciences". Later, al-Mustansir (Al-Hakam II) went yet further, building a university and libraries in Córdoba. Córdoba became one of the world's leading centres of medicine and philosophical debate.

When Al-Hakam's son Hisham II took over, real power was ceded to the hajib, al-Mansur Ibn Abi Aamir. Al-Mansur was a distinctly religious man and disapproved of the sciences of astronomy, logic, and especially of astrology, so much so that many books on these subjects, which had been preserved and collected at great expense by Al-Hakam II, were burned publicly. With Al-Mansur's death in 1002, interest in philosophy revived. Numerous scholars emerged, including Abu Uthman Ibn Fathun, whose masterwork was the philosophical treatise "Tree of Wisdom". Maslamah Ibn Ahmad al-Majriti (died 1008) was an outstanding scholar in astronomy and astrology; he was an intrepid traveller who journeyed all over the Islamic world and beyond and kept in touch with the Brethren of Purity. He is said to have brought the 51 "Epistles of the Brethren of Purity" to al-Andalus and added the compendium to this work, although it is quite possible that it was added later by another scholar with the name al-Majriti. Another book attributed to al-Majriti is the Ghayat al-Hakim, "The Aim of the Sage", which explored a synthesis of Platonism with Hermetic philosophy. Its use of incantations led the book to be widely dismissed in later years, although the Sufi communities continued to study it.

A prominent follower of al-Majriti was the philosopher and geometer Abu al-Hakam al-Kirmani who was followed, in turn, by Abu Bakr Ibn al-Sayigh, usually known in the Arab world as Ibn Bajjah, "Avempace".

The al-Andalus philosopher Averroes (1126–1198) was the founder of the Averroism school of philosophy, and his works and commentaries influenced medieval thought in Western Europe. Another influential al-Andalus philosopher was Ibn Tufail.

Jewish philosophy and culture

As Jewish thought in Babylonia declined, the tolerance of al-Andalus made it the new centre of Jewish intellectual endeavours. Poets and commentators like Judah Halevi (1086–1145) and Dunash ben Labrat (920–990) contributed to the cultural life of al-Andalus, but the area was even more important to the development of Jewish philosophy. A stream of Jewish philosophers, cross-fertilizing with Muslim philosophers (see joint Jewish and Islamic philosophies), culminated with the widely celebrated Jewish thinker of the Middle Ages, Maimonides (1135–1205), though he did not actually do any of his work in al-Andalus, his family having fled persecution by the Almohads when he was 13.

Homosexuality and pederasty
The Encyclopedia of Homosexuality states that "Al-Andalus had many links to Hellenistic culture, and except for the Almoravid and Almohadic periods (1086–1212), it was hedonistic and tolerant of homosexuality, indeed one of the times in world history in which sensuality of all sorts has been most openly enjoyed. Important rulers such as Abd al-Rahman III, al-Hakam II, Hisham II, and al-Mu-tamid openly chose boys as sexual partners, and kept catamites. Homosexual prostitution was widespread, and its customers came from higher levels of society than those of heterosexual prostitutes." The verses of Ibn Quzman describe an openly bisexual lifestyle. Andalusi anthologies of poetry such as the Rāyāt al-mubarrizīn wa-ghāyāt al-mumayyazīn are known in part for their homoerotic and "abundant pederastic poetry". Such themes were also found in the Sephardic Jewish poetry of the time.

In the book Medieval Iberia: An Encyclopedia Daniel Eisenberg describes homosexuality as "a key symbolic issue throughout the Middle Ages in Iberia", stating that "in al-Andalus homosexual pleasures were much indulged in by the intellectual and political elite. Evidence includes the behaviour of rulers, such as Abd al-Rahmn III, Al-Hakam II, Hisham II, and Al Mu'tamid, who openly kept male harems; the memoirs of Abdallah ibn Buluggin, last Zirid king of Granada, makes references to male prostitutes, who charged higher fees and had a higher class of clientele than did their female counterparts: the repeated criticisms of Christians; and especially the abundant poetry. Both pederasty and love between adult males are found. Although homosexual practices were never officially condoned, prohibitions against them were rarely enforced, and usually there was not even a pretense of doing so." Male homosexual relations allowed nonprocreative sexual practices and were not seen as a form of identity. Very little is known about the homosexual behaviour of women.

Slavery

Slavery existed in Muslim al-Andalus as well as in the Christian kingdoms, and both sides of the religious border followed the custom of not enslaving people of their own religion.  Consequently, Muslims were enslaved in Christian lands, while Christians and other non-Muslims were enslaved in al-Andalus.

The Moors imported white Christian slaves from the 8th century until the end of the Reconquista in the late 15th century. The slaves were exported from the Christian section of Spain, as well as Eastern Europe (Saqaliba). Saqaliba slavery in al-Andalus was especially prominent in the Caliphate of Cordoba where white slaves constituted most of the administrative personnel in the courts and palaces.

The slaves of the Caliph were often European saqaliba slaves trafficked from Northern or Eastern Europe. While male saqaliba could be given work in a number of tasks, such as offices in the kitchen, falconry, mint, textile workshops, the administration or the royal guard (in the case of harem guards, they were castrated), female saqaliba were placed in the harem.

The harem could contain thousands of slave concubines; the harem of Abd al-Rahman I consisted of 6,300 women. They were appreciated for their light skin. The concubines (jawaris) were educated in accomplishments to please their master, and many became known and respected for their knowledge in a variety of subjects from music to medicine. Jawaris concubines who gave birth to a child attained the status of an umm walad, which meant that they could no longer be sold and were to be set free after the death of her master.

 Legacy 
As Andalusi cities were conquered by Leon, Castile, and other Christian Spanish kingdoms, Christian monarchs such as Alfonso X of Castile started translating the mountainous libraries of al-Andalus into Latin. These libraries contained translations of Ancient Greek texts, as well as new ones made by Muslims in the Islamic Golden Age. That, combined with the interaction with Muslims during the Crusades, and the Fall of Constantinople introducing Greek scholars to the west, helped launch the Renaissance. Scientists and philosophers such as Averroes and Al-Zahrawi (fathers of rationalism and surgery, respectively) heavily inspired the Renaissance, and their ideas are still world renowned to this day. Al Andalus has also left art and architecture and has some of the best preserved Islamic Golden Age architecture in the world, with examples including the Cathedral of Córdoba, the Alhambra, the Giralda and many more.

See also

 Gharb Al-Andalus
 Arab diaspora
 La Convivencia
 History of Islam
 History of the Jews under Muslim rule
 Hispanic and Latino Muslims
 Islam and anti-Semitism in Iberia
 Islam in Spain
 Islam in Portugal
 List of Andalusi and Moroccan writers
 Moorish Gibraltar
 Muslim conquests
 Kemal Reis
 Social and cultural exchange in Al-Andalus
 Timeline of the Muslim presence in the Iberian peninsula

History

Notes

References

Bibliography

 Alfonso, Esperanza, 2007. Islamic Culture Through Jewish Eyes: al-Andalus from the Tenth to Twelfth Century. NY: Routledge. 
 Al-Djazairi, Salah Eddine 2005. The Hidden Debt to Islamic Civilisation. Manchester: Bayt Al-Hikma Press. 
 Bossong, Georg. 2002. "Der Name Al-Andalus: Neue Überlegungen zu einem alten Problem", Sounds and Systems: Studies in Structure and Change. A Festschrift for Theo Vennemann, eds. David Restle & Dietmar Zaefferer. Berlin: Mouton de Gruyter, pp. 149–164. (In German) Also available online
 Calderwood, Eric. 2018. Colonial al-Andalus : Spain and the making of modern Moroccan culture. Harvard University Press
 Cohen, Mark. 1994. Under Crescent and Cross: The Jews in the Middle Ages. Princeton, NJ: Princeton University Press. 
 Collins, Roger. 1989. The Arab Conquest of Spain, 710–797, Oxford: Blackwell. 
 
 Fernandez-Morera,  Dario. 2016. The Myth of the Andalusian Paradise: Muslims, Christians, and Jews under Islamic Rule in Medieval Spain. NY: Intercollegiate Studies Institute. 
 Frank, Daniel H. & Leaman, Oliver. 2003. The Cambridge Companion to Medieval Jewish Philosophy. Cambridge: Cambridge University Press. 
 Gerli, E. Michael, ed., 2003. Medieval Iberia: An Encyclopedia. NY: Routledge. 
 Halm, Heinz. 1989. "Al-Andalus und Gothica Sors",  66:252–263.
 Hamilton, Michelle M., Sarah J. Portnoy, and David A. Wacks, eds. 2004. Wine, Women, and Song: Hebrew and Arabic Literature in Medieval Iberia. Newark, Del.: Juan de la Cuesta Hispanic Monographs.
 Harzig, Christiane, Dirk Hoerder, and Adrian Shubert. 2003. The Historical Practice in Diversity. Berghahn Books. 
 Jayyusi, Salma Khadra. 1992. The Legacy of Muslim Spain, 2 vols. Leiden–NY–Cologne: Brill [chief consultant to the editor, Manuela Marín].
 Kennedy, Hugh. 1996. Muslim Spain and Portugal: A Political History of al-Andalus, Longman. 
 Kraemer, Joel. 1997. "Comparing Crescent and Cross (book review)", The Journal of Religion 77, no. 3 (1997): 449–454.
 Kraemer, Joel. 2005. "Moses Maimonides: An Intellectual Portrait", The Cambridge Companion to Maimonides, ed. Kenneth Seeskin. Cambridge: Cambridge University Press. 
 Kraemer, Joel. 2008. Maimonides: the Life and World of One of Civilization's Greatest Minds. NY: Doubleday. 
 Lafuente y Alcántara, Emilio, trans. 1867. Ajbar Machmua (colección de tradiciones): crónica anónima del siglo XI, dada a luz por primera vez, traducida y anotada. Madrid: Real Academia de la Historia y Geografía. In Spanish and Arabic. Also available in the public domain online, see External Links.
 Luscombe, David and Jonathan Riley-Smith, eds. 2004. The New Cambridge Medieval History: Volume 4, c. 1024 c. 1198, Part 1. Cambridge: Cambridge University Press. 
 Marcus, Ivan G., "Beyond the Sephardic mystique", Orim, vol. 1 (1985): 35–53.
 Marín, Manuela, ed. 1998. The Formation of Al-Andalus, vol. 1: History and Society. Aldershot: Ashgate. 
 Menocal, Maria Rosa. 2002. Ornament of the World: How Muslims, Jews, and Christians Created a Culture of Tolerance in Medieval Spain. Boston: Little, Brown and Company; London: Back Bay Books. 
 Monroe, James T. 1970. Islam and the Arabs in Spanish scholarship: (Sixteenth century to the present). Leiden: Brill.
 Monroe, James T. 1974. Hispano-Arabic Poetry: A Student Anthology. Berkeley, Cal.: University of California Press.
 Netanyahu, Benzion. 1995. The Origins Of The Inquisition in Fifteenth Century Spain. NY: Random House 
 O'Callaghan, Joseph F. 1975. A History of Medieval Spain. Ithaca, NY: Cornell University Press. 
 Omaar, Rageh. 2005. An Islamic History of Europe. video documentary, BBC 4, August 2005.
 Reilly, Bernard F. 1993. The Medieval Spains. Cambridge: Cambridge University Press. 
 Roth, Norman. 1994. Jews, Visigoths and Muslims in Medieval Spain: Cooperation and Conflict. Leiden: Brill. 
 Sanchez-Albornoz, Claudio. 1974. El Islam de España y el Occidente. Madrid: Espasa-Calpe. Colección Austral; 1560. [Originally published in 1965 in the conference proceedings, L'occidente e l'islam nell'alto medioevo: 2-8 aprile 1964, 2 vols. Spoleto: Centro Italiano di studi sull'Alto Medioevo. Series: Settimane di studio del Centro Italiano di studi sull'Alto Medioevo; 12. Vol. 1:149–308.]
 Schorsch, Ismar, 1989. "The myth of Sephardic supremacy", The Leo Baeck Institute Yearbook 34 (1989): 47–66.
 Stavans, Ilan. 2003. The Scroll and the Cross: 1,000 Years of Jewish-Hispanic Literature. London: Routledge. 
 
 Wasserstein, David J. 1995. "Jewish élites in Al-Andalus", The Jews of Medieval Islam: Community, Society and Identity, ed. Daniel Frank. Leiden: Brill. 

Further reading
 
 

External links

 Photocopy of the Ajbar Machmu'a, translated by Lafuente 1867
 The routes of al-Andalus (from the UNESCO web site)
 The Library of Iberian Resources Online
 Al-Andalus Chronology and Photos
 Christian Martyrs in Muslim Spain by Kenneth Baxter Wolf
 The Musical Legacy of Al-Andalus – historical maps, photos, and music showing the Great Mosque of Córdoba and related movements of people and culture over time
 "Cities of Light: The Rise and Fall of Islamic Spain" (documentary film)
 Al-Andalus: the art of Islamic Spain, Scholarly essays and exhibition catalog from the Metropolitan Museum of Art (fully available online as PDF or on Google Books)
 Patricia, Countess Jellicoe, 1992, The Art of Islamic Spain, Saudi Aramco World''
 History of the Spanish Muslims, by Reinhart Dozy, in French

 
Former countries on the Iberian Peninsula
Former empires in Europe
Former Muslim countries in Europe
Former Arab states
History of Andalusia
History of Spain
History of Portugal by polity
Invasions of Europe
Islam in Gibraltar
Islam in Portugal
Islam in Spain
Medieval Islamic world
Medieval Portugal
Medieval Spain
Muslim empires
States and territories established in the 710s
States and territories disestablished in 1492
711 establishments
8th-century establishments in Portugal
8th-century establishments in Spain
1492 disestablishments in Spain
1st millennium in Spain
2nd millennium in Spain
Subdivisions of the Umayyad Caliphate
8th-century establishments in the Umayyad Caliphate
Arabic-speaking countries and territories